Linda Finnie (born 9 May 1952) is a Scottish mezzo-soprano. She made her debut in 1976 with Scottish Opera, and has since made appearances all over Europe, including at Bayreuth (in 1988).

References

 Grove Music Online 

1952 births
Living people
Scottish operatic mezzo-sopranos
21st-century Scottish women opera singers
20th-century Scottish women opera singers